George Albert Marchant (1849–1943) was a 19th-century Member of Parliament in Taranaki, New Zealand.

References

1849 births
1943 deaths
Members of the New Zealand House of Representatives
New Zealand MPs for North Island electorates
19th-century New Zealand politicians